Amanpuri is a luxury resort and the flagship property of Aman Resorts. Its name means 'place of peace' in Sanskrit. It  is on the west coast of the Thai island of Phuket. The resort is situated on a coconut grove overlooking the Andaman Sea, and includes a stretch of Pansea Beach.

History
While in Phuket looking for a site upon which to build a holiday home, Adrian Zecha was walking along Pansea Beach when he came across a coconut plantation in a prime location. Plans to build a home on the site soon developed into an idea to build a small boutique resort, in partnership with Anil Thadani and two other friends. They spent mainly their own money as no banks would extend credit for the project due to the small number of planned rooms, instead of the 500-room hotel they thought would be more practical. The resort was opened in 1988 at a cost of US$4 million. It was designed by American architect Ed Tuttle, who took his inspiration from traditional Thai temple architecture, in particular the ancient Thai capital of Ayutthaya.

Facilities
The resort contains 40 pavilions and 44 villas spread over 24 hectares on a headland on the northern side of Pansea beach. Each villa features a swimming pool, separate dining and living rooms, kitchen and up to 9 bedrooms.

There are 4 restaurants including Arva (Italian), a South American Lounge and Nama (Japanese), focusing on Washoku cuisine.

The Aman Spa features six treatment rooms, and offers four wellness journeys. Conde Nast Traveller awarded Amanpuri ‘Best Bespoke Retreats’ in The Spa Awards 2017. 

Amanpuri has a 27-metre freshwater main pool and a 20-metre lap pool. From the beach, paddleboards, Schiller Bikes, snorkelling and kayaking equipment, along with Hobie Cats, are available for windsurfing, snorkelling and kayaking on Pansea Beach. Amanpuri also offers a large selection of vessels for cruising, day trips or overnight charters. There is also Beach Club, a library, 6 tennis courts, a gym, a Pilates studio, a boardroom equipped for meetings and a gallery with a selection of items for purchase.

References

Further reading
 Allison Arieff, Bryan Burkhart: “Spa”. Published by Taschen. .
 Kim Inglis, Jacob Termansen, Pia Marie Molbech: “Asian Style Hotels“. Published by Periplus Editions. .
 Herbert J. M. Ypma: “Hip Hotels: Orient“. Published by Thames & Hudson. .

External links
 

Aman Resorts
Buildings and structures in Phuket province
Hotels in Thailand
Resorts in Thailand
Tourist attractions in Phuket province
1988 establishments in Thailand